Kelvin Sylvester Jeffers (born 2 September 1963) is a Nevis-born former British Virgin Islands cricketer. Jeffers was a right-handed batsman.

In 2006, the British Virgin Islands were invited to take part in the 2006 Stanford 20/20, whose matches held official Twenty20 status. Jeffers made a single appearance in the tournament against Saint Lucia in a preliminary round defeat, with him being dismissed for a duck by Alleyn Prospere. He also captained the team in this match. He later played for the team in its second appearance in the Stanford 20/20 in 2008, making a single appearance in a preliminary round defeat against Dominica, where he was dismissed for 4 runs by Mervin Matthew. He didn't captain the team in this match, with the captaincy having passed to Vishal Bharat.

References

External links
Kelvin Jeffers at ESPNcricinfo
Kelvin Jeffers at CricketArchive

1963 births
Living people
Nevisian cricketers
British Virgin Islands cricketers
Saint Kitts and Nevis emigrants to the British Virgin Islands